Torreglia is a comune (municipality) in the Province of Padua in the Italian  Veneto region, located about  west of Venice and about  southwest of Padua.

Torreglia borders the following municipalities: Abano Terme, Galzignano Terme, Montegrotto Terme, Teolo. The 16th century Villa dei Vescovi, Luvigliano is located in this territory.

Demographic evolution

References

Gallery

Cities and towns in Veneto